Three-time defending champions Alfie Hewett and Gordon Reid defeated Stéphane Houdet and Nicolas Peifer in a rematch of the 2018 final, 6–4, 6–1 to win the men's doubles wheelchair tennis title at the 2020 US Open.

Seeds

Draw

Bracket

References

External links 
 Draw

Wheelchair Men's Doubles
U.S. Open, 2020 Men's Doubles